Dudgeonea is a small genus of moths and the only genus of its family, the Dudgeoneidae. It includes six species distributed sparsely across the Old World from Africa and Madagascar to Australia and New Guinea.

Biology
The genus is poorly studied, but the Australian species, Dudgeonea actinias, tunnels in trunks of Canthium attenuatum (Rubiaceae) and the pupa is extruded like many other internal feeders.

References

External links
Australian Moths Online

 
Moth genera